Quarter 95, 95th Quarter, or Kvartal 95 may refer to:

Quarter 95, a public square in Kryvyi Rih, Ukraine
Kvartal 95 Studio, a television entertainment production company, Ukraine
, a KVN team,  Kryvyi Rih, Ukraine

uk:95 квартал (значення)